American Axle & Manufacturing, Inc. (AAM), headquartered in Detroit, Michigan, is an American manufacturer of automobile driveline and drivetrain components and systems.

History 
AAM was founded in 1994 when a private investor group, led by Richard E. "Dick" Dauch, James W. McLernon, Raymond Park and Morton E. Harris purchased the Final Drive and Forge Business Unit from GM's Saginaw Division. In 1999, AAM went public, and is traded as "AXL" on the New York Stock Exchange (NYSE). AAM has grown to supply various OEM manufacturers around the globe in the passenger car, light truck, and commercial vehicle segments.

AAM's World Headquarters building, erected in 2004, is located on the Detroit/Hamtramck border.

2008 strike 
On February 26, 2008, approximately 4600 AAM employees went on what would be a three-month-long strike to protest a proposed wage and benefit cut by the company's management. The proposal would reduce production workers' hourly wage from $28 to $18 and cut skilled trade wages $5 per hour. The strike cost General Motors $2.6 billion as the automaker lost the production of its Chevrolet Malibu sedan and other vehicles.

Products
Key products include axles, drive shafts, front axle, universal joints and sealing and thermal-management products.

Axles
10.5" Corporate 14 Bolt Differential
Saginaw 9.5-inch axle

Demolition 
After closing its factories in Detroit in 2012, American Axle and Manufacturing had started a demolition project. In late 2013, much of the old manufacturing facility had been demolished by bulldozers and cranes. Also, in February 2014, it was reported and confirmed that most of the Detroit/Hamtramck manufacturing site had been sold  to a California-based Industrial Realty Group, IRG LLC who specialize in the use of industrial buildings for other developments such as apartment complexes. In 2014, American Axle continued to own its headquarters and greenbelt property at the site. It planned to build an engineering facility in the sole building left standing from the original manufacturing complex.

UK subsidiary
Albion Automotive is a Glasgow-based subsidiary.

In 2002, the Court of Appeal ruled in a case brought by staff employed at Albion's Farington site in Lancashire, Albion Automotive Ltd w. Walker and others, that a contractual term entitling employees to an enhanced redundancy payment could be implied into the employees' contracts of employment based on the employer's custom and practice.

US competitors 
 Meritor
 Dana

References

External links 
 
 

Automotive transmission makers
Auto parts suppliers of the United States
Manufacturing companies based in Detroit
Automotive companies established in 1994
1994 establishments in Michigan
Private equity portfolio companies
The Blackstone Group companies
Companies listed on the New York Stock Exchange